The 1920 Central Michigan Normalites football team represented Central Michigan Normal School, later renamed Central Michigan University, as an independent during the 1920 college football season. In their first and only season under head coach Joe Simmons, the Central Michigan football team compiled a 4–3–1 record, shut out four of eight opponents, and outscored all opponents by a combined total of 166 to 41. The team's victories were against Ferris State (80–0 and 34–0), Olivet (7–0), and Hope (17–0), and the tie was with Detroit City College (6–6).  The team lost to the 1920 Michigan State Normal Normalites football team (6–7), the Michigan Agricultural frosh team (6–14), and Hillsdale (10–14).

Coach Simmons was a recent graduate of Carthage College in Kenosha, Wisconsin, where he earned 16 varsity letters in four sports. He later coached high school football in Milwaukee.

Schedule

References

Central Michigan
Central Michigan Chippewas football seasons
Central Michigan Normalites football